Welty's Mill Bridge is a historic multi-span stone arch bridge located at Washington Township in Franklin County, Pennsylvania. It was constructed in 1856. It crosses the East Branch of Little Antietam.

It was listed on the National Register of Historic Places in 1983.

References 

Road bridges on the National Register of Historic Places in Pennsylvania
Bridges completed in 1856
Bridges in Franklin County, Pennsylvania
National Register of Historic Places in Franklin County, Pennsylvania
Stone arch bridges in the United States